The Walter M. Bartlett Double House is a historic building located in Des Moines, Iowa, United States.  Built in 1913, the two-story structure features balloon frame construction.  The Neoclassical style building originally had a large portico on the main facade that has been covered over.  The window in the pediment is still visible.  In addition to its architecture, its significance is attributed to its location on the Sixth Avenue streetcar route.  It was part of the development of the area from single-family dwellings to denser residential use.  It is also a subtype of the double house called a "two-unit flat", also known as a
"double-decker."  The house was listed on the National Register of Historic Places in 1998.

References

Houses completed in 1913
Neoclassical architecture in Iowa
Houses in Des Moines, Iowa
National Register of Historic Places in Des Moines, Iowa
Houses on the National Register of Historic Places in Iowa